ABC Reading Eggs (stylised as Reading eggs or simply Reading Eggs internationally) is a subscription-based digital education program for children ages 2 to 13, which studies reading. Similar to Starfall.com and ABCmouse.com, it has, however, been criticized as not providing reading education for children with learning disabilities. It was owned by the ABC Kids unit of the Australian Broadcasting Corporation in Australia and Edmentum internationally. Reading Eggs consists of 5 programs, Reading Eggs Junior (for preschoolers ages 2–4) starting in 2017, Reading Eggs (for children ages 3–7), Reading Eggspress (for children ages 7–13), Mathseeds (for children ages 3–8) and Fast Phonics (for children ages 5–10).

The website has been used as a testing platform in numerous educational studies.

ABC Reading Eggs Junior (stylised as Reading eggs Junior or simply Reading Eggs Junior internationally) aimed at preschoolers ages 2–4 launched in 2017. Reading Eggs Junior studies preschool subjects, including Reggie & Friends and Reggie's Boxes.

The Reading Eggs App was the subject of criticism in 2019 for an inappropriate spelling lesson; and in 2020 that it was "more like a video game than an educational tool". However, in 2022 it was considered a staple in Australian schools.

References

Australian educational websites
2008 establishments in Australia